David Shannon Morse (April 15, 1943 – November 2, 2007) was the cofounder of Amiga. In 1982, he left Tonka Toys (where he was Vice-President of Marketing) and became the Chief Executive Officer at Hi Toro, Inc., which he co-founded and which later that year morphed into Amiga, Inc. which he led through the development of the Lorraine Project (a codename inspired by David's wife Lorraine), ultimately, the Amiga 1000 computer. In the 1980s he was a software manager at Epyx, a video game developer and publisher where he helped to create the Atari Lynx, being credited with designing the graphics chip. In 1992 Morse would help co-found Crystal Dynamics with Judy Lange and Madeline Canepa, a video game developer famous for their extensive library.

References

1943 births
2007 deaths
Amiga people